The Masked Rider: Kamen Rider ZO  is a video game developed by Toei and published by Sega of America for the Sega CD.

Gameplay
The Masked Rider: Kamen Rider ZO uses video footage ported from the film Kamen Rider ZO. It is an Interactive film game.

Reception
Next Generation reviewed the Sega CD game, rating it two stars out of five, and stated that "It's guy-in-rubber suit action at the 'Ultraman' level which has a certain appeal to some folks I know.  But as a game, it's almost worthless."

Reviews
GamePro (Feb, 1995)
All Game Guide - 1998
Video Games & Computer Entertainment (Feb, 1995)

Notes

References

External links
 The Masked Rider: Kamen Rider ZO at GameFAQs
 The Masked Rider: Kamen Rider ZO at Giant Bomb
 The Masked Rider: Kamen Rider ZO at MobyGames

1994 video games
Full motion video based games
Sega CD games
Sega CD-only games
Kamen Rider video games
Video games developed in Japan